Navas del Rey is a municipality of the Community of Madrid, Spain.  It is located 52 kilometers from the city of Madrid, which is accessed by the road M-501 .

Navas del Rey is located in a transition zone between the Sierra de Guadarrama and Sierra de Gredos . To the north the municipality borders the village of Robledo de Chavela, east to the towns of Chapinería and Colmenar del Arroyo, south to Aldea del Fresno and west Pelayos Dam and San Martin de Valdeiglesias .
Along with other municipalities make up what is called the Commonwealth of Pinares, through which are channeled much of the initiatives from the various municipalities that are grouped in this commonwealth .

Rural Tourism
Township Navas del Rey is located in the southwest of the Autonomous Community of Madrid, within the region of Basin Alberche river, its location in the transition zone between the Sierra de Guadarrama and Sierra de Gredos, makes it an ideal place for rural tourism .

In the municipality there is a significant number of plant and animal species of low ecological value. Its characteristic forests of oaks and pines give a unique color to the landscape. In its unique fauna includes species in danger of extinction, such as the imperial eagle, the black stork .

References

Municipalities in the Community of Madrid